The Musashi ninespine stickleback (Pungitius sp.) or  is an undescribed fish in the stickleback genus Pungitius. It is assessed as Critically Endangered on the 2020 Ministry of the Environment Red List.

Gallery

See also

 List of freshwater fish of Japan
 Meanings of minor planet names: 10001–11000

References

Undescribed vertebrate species
Freshwater fish of Japan
Kumagaya
Pungitius